Statistics Sweden (SCB) is the Swedish government agency operating under the Ministry of Finance and responsible for producing official statistics for decision-making, debate and research. The agency's responsibilities include:
 developing, producing and disseminating statistics;
 active participation in international statistical cooperation;
 coordination and support of the Swedish system for official statistics, which includes 26 authorities responsible for official statistics in their areas of expertise.

National statistics in Sweden date back to 1686 when the parishes of the Church of Sweden were ordered to start keeping records on the population. SCB's predecessor, the Tabellverket ("office for tabulation"), was set up in 1749, and the current name was adopted in 1858.

Subjects
Statistics Sweden produces statistics in several different subject areas:

, the agency had approximately 1,350 employees. The offices of the agency are located in Stockholm and Örebro. Statistics Sweden publishes the Journal of Official Statistics.

See also
Demographics of Sweden
Eurostat
Government agencies in Sweden
List of national and international statistical services

References

External links
 

Demographics of Sweden
Government agencies of Sweden
National statistical services
1858 establishments in Sweden
Government agencies established in 1858